Little Thompson River is a stream in Sanders County, Montana. It is a left tributary of the larger Thompson River of Montana, itself a tributary of the Clark Fork River. It has its headwaters in Lolo National Forest, where it is fed by a number of smaller creeks and streams.

See also

List of rivers of Montana
Tributaries of the Columbia River

References 

Rivers of Montana
Tributaries of the Columbia River
Rivers of Sanders County, Montana